Health in Israel is generally considered good.

Infant mortality is low.  Life expectancy, 82.1 years is high.  There is good management of chronic disease and excellent primary care.  Expenditure on healthcare is 7.2% of Gross Domestic Product, compared with an average of 9.2% in the OECD.

In 2003, Israel had the second highest rate of skin cancer in the world, but this has decreased substantially since then due to public health campaigns recommending avoiding the hottest time of day, discouraging sun-bathing and using sun protection such as greater clothing coverage and sunscreen.

Hereditary Breast, Ovarain and Melanoma cancer rates are particularly acute in Ashkenazi Jewish populations in Israel (31.8% of Israeli Jews), in-part due to a higher-prevalence of BRCA and BRCA2 mutations (1 in 40 vs 1 in 400 in most populations worldwide) in Ashkenazi Jewish populations, which increase the likelihood of hereditary cancers.

Overweight and obesity
In 2013-2015 adult overweight & obesity rates in Israel were 36.7% and 17.8% respectively. Socioeconomic status was one factor that impacted overweight and obesity percentages, particularly for women. Women in lower classes were four times as likely to be overweight or obese as women in upper classes. Only 20.2% of the entire population reported that they exercise for twenty minutes or more three times a week.

The frequency of exercise among the Jewish Israeli population was twice as high as that for the Arab population. Men and women of Arab descent are more likely to be of an unhealthy weight than Jewish men and women. Obesity is also far more common among Haredi Jews than secular Jews.

Smoking
Smoking prevalence among males  remained relatively constant at 30%  in the years 1994–2004. Among females the prevalence declined slightly from 25% in 1998 to 18% in 2003. For youth, 14% smoked at least once per week in a 2001 publication.

In 2005 Israeli youths have begun to use bidis and hookah, as alternative methods of tobacco use. In 1990, smoking was the cause of about 1,800 male deaths in Israel which was around 12% of all male deaths. Smoking has not been found to be significant cause of death among Israeli women. The average number of cigarettes smoked per Israeli stands at 2162 (6).

There are several anti-tobacco use legislations in effect. For instance, advertising is prohibited in youth publications and is forbidden on television and radio. in addition to substantial increases in tobacco taxes, although comparatively the prices are still among the lowest compared to all of the European countries. Until 2004, there was no minimum age requirement for buying tobacco products in Israel, however, an amendment to the tobacco marketing and advertisement law that became effective at 2004 has limited the sale of tobacco to people above the age of 18.

According to Israel Central Bureau of Statistics, the smoking rate in the Israeli adult population in 2009 was 20.9%, down from 34% in 2000. A Ministry of Health nationwide survey conducted in 2011 found that 20.6% of the population aged 21 and older were smokers. The highest percentage of smokers was among Arab males, 44% percent of whom smoked, though this figure is down from 50% in 1996.

In 2014 19.8% of adult Israelis smoked, 26.3% in the Arab population and 18.4% in the Jewish population. 35% of non-smoking respondents to the World Health Survey reported that they had been exposed to passive smoking.  Smoking is responsible for about 8,000 deaths in Israel every year, about 700 among passive smokers. The cost of the damage of smoking to the health system is estimated at NIS 1.7 billion (about $440 million) a year.  The annual loss of working capacity and paid sick days in the wider economy is estimated at NIS 1.9 billion ($490 million). About NIS 8.2 billion ($2.12 billion) is spent on tobacco products each year.   40 tons of tobacco worth some NIS 24 million ($6.2 million) and about 1.3 million cigarette packs were intercepted at the border crossing between Israel and the Palestinian Authority in 2014.

See also
 Healthcare in Israel
 Universal healthcare in Israel

References